God Moves on the Water is a gospel blues song recorded by Blind Willie Johnson in 1929 and released on a 78 rpm record by Columbia Records.

The song describes the sinking of RMS Titanic and the consequent loss of life after it struck an iceberg on April 14, 1912. Its origins are obscure: topical songs are generally written soon after the event to which they relate. Johnson's lyrics call the ship's captain, E. J. Smith, A. G. Smith, which suggests an oral tradition. The fact that two of the earliest recordings, by Johnson in 1929 and by Mance Lipscomb in 1965, were made by Texans suggests an origin in that state.

The title may allude to the Book of Genesis at 1:2: "And the Spirit of God moved upon the face of the waters". If it does, the song may derive from an earlier gospel song, now lost.

Recordings 
The following recordings are by notable musicians:
 1929Blind Willie Johnson 
 196371Rory Block and Stefan Grossman, as an instrumental 
 1965Mance Lipscomb, live at the 1965 Newport Folk Festival
1966Mance Lipscomb, live at the 1966 Berkeley Folk Music Festival
 1972Stefan Grossman, as an instrumental 
 2000Guy Forsyth
 2003Chris Jones and Steve Baker, on the album Smoke and Noise 
 2003Chris Jones, on the album Roadhouses and Automobiles 
 2004Mary Margaret O'Hara
 2008Garrison Keillor, on the album A Prairie Home Companion 4th Annual Farewell Performance 
 2009Charlie Parr, on the album Roustabout 
 2011Charlie Parr, on the album Keep your Hands on the Plow 
 2011"God Moves on Water" by Dead Rock West, on the album Bright Morning Stars 
 2020Larkin Poe, on the album Self-Made Man

References 

Blind Willie Johnson songs
1929 songs
Works about RMS Titanic
Songwriter unknown